History Cooperative was an online database of scholarly history articles from leading journals.  It provided online access to library users to recent articles from 20 major journals and other online sources. It closed operations in May, 2010. It was originally created by the University of Illinois Press, and was also sponsored by JSTOR and the Organization of American Historians.  It was a not-for-profit venture that was open to libraries and to paid subscribers of the individual journals.

Some of the journals available included:
American Historical Review
The History Teacher
Journal of American Ethnic History
Journal of American History
Journal of the Gilded Age and Progressive Era
Journal of World History
Labour History
Western Historical Quarterly
William and Mary Quarterly

See also
 Project MUSE

References

Bibliography
 Rosenzweig, Roy. "The Road to Xanadu: Public and Private Pathways on the History Web," Journal of American History  vol 88 #2 (2001): 78 pars. 17 Oct. 2010 online.

External links
 The present "historycooperative.org" blogging platform/website has no relationship to the original website and its previous sponsors and partners.

Non-profit organizations based in the United States
Bibliographic databases and indexes
2010 disestablishments in the United States